Keri River is a river in western India in Gujarat whose origin is in the Hindod hills. Its basin has a maximum length of 183 km. The total catchment area of the basin is 560 km2.

References

Rivers of Gujarat
Rivers of India